The Spaulding Block is a historic commercial building in Webster, Massachusetts.  One of the oldest commercial buildings in Webster, this three story brick building was built in 1866 by Cyrus Spaulding, and housed his hardware store.  The Webster Times was also an early occupant, after its previous home was burned out.  The building underwent a major renovation in 1897, receiving a new facade with Tudor styling.

The block was listed on the National Register of Historic Places in 1980.

See also
National Register of Historic Places listings in Worcester County, Massachusetts

References

Commercial blocks on the National Register of Historic Places in Massachusetts
Buildings and structures in Webster, Massachusetts
National Register of Historic Places in Worcester County, Massachusetts